Kultali Dr. B. R. Ambedkar College, established in 2005, is an undergraduate college in Kultali , South 24 Parganas , West Bengal, India. It is affiliated with the University of Calcutta.

Departments

Arts

Bengali
English
History
Geography
Political Science
Philosophy
Sociology
Education

See also 
List of colleges affiliated to the University of Calcutta
Education in India
Education in West Bengal

References

External links
Kultali Dr. B.R. Ambedkar College

University of Calcutta affiliates
Universities and colleges in South 24 Parganas district
Educational institutions established in 2005
2005 establishments in West Bengal